Dichostemma is a flowering plant genus in the family Euphorbiaceae first described as a genus in 1896. It is native to tropical western and central Africa.

Species
 Dichostemma glaucescens Pierre - Nigeria, Cameroon, Gabon, Republic of the Congo, Central African Republic, Cabinda, Democratic Republic of the Congo
 Dichostemma zenkeri Pax - Cameroon

References 

Euphorbiaceae genera
Euphorbieae
Flora of West-Central Tropical Africa
Flora of Nigeria